Phyllonorycter parisiella is a moth of the family Gracillariidae. It is found from the Czech Republic and Slovakia to the Pyrenees, Sardinia, Italy and North Macedonia and from France to Romania.

The larvae feed on Quercus pubescens. They mine the leaves of their host plant. They create a medium-sized lower-surface tentiform mine with one strong fold in the lower epidermis. The roof of the mine is generally not completely eaten out, leaving a green centre. Pupation takes place within the mine in a cocoon that is almost entirely covered with frass.

References

parisiella
Moths of Europe
Moths described in 1848